Puran puri (પુરણ પુરી), Puran poli (पुरण पोळी), Holige (ಹೋಳಿಗೆ), Obbattu (ಒಬ್ಬಟ್ಟು), or Bobbattlu (బొబ్బట్లు) , Poley( పోళె) , Bakshamulu( బక్ష్యములు), is an Indian sweet flatbread that originates from Southern India.

Names 

It is usually served with paal payasam in meals and feasts in Kerala and Tamil Nadu.

History 
Its recipe (as bakshyam) is mentioned in Manucharitra, a 14th-century Telugu encyclopaedia compiled by Allasani Peddanna hailing from present-day Andhra Pradesh.
Bhavaprakash and Bhaishajya Ratnavali written by Govind dasa states recipe while explaining as part of Ayurvedic preparations. There are other Sanskrit references to the 12th-century texts written by King Someshvar of Southern India.

Ingredients
Holige is made from senaga pappu, plain flour (wheat flour), jaggery or cane sugar, cardamom powder and/or nutmeg powder, ghee and water. Sometimes pigeon pea is used in Gujarat. It is commonly used in the state of Karnataka and Tamil Nadu as well. In Andhra Pradesh and other places, pesara pappu, chickpea (senaga pappu) or a mix is used. Other ingredients that may or may not be used are: nuts, dates, and turmeric powder.

Nutritional value 

The predominant ingredients are chana, plain flour, jaggery or sugar.

1. Chana:
It is a variant of chickpea. It provides fiber, is a major source of protein, may help reduce cholesterol and also contains zinc, folate and calcium. Toor dal can be used in place of chana dal and it has similar properties as of chana dal.

2. Plain flour, jaggery or sugar:
These are the major sources of carbohydrates. While plain flour adds complex carbohydrates, jaggery and sugar are simple carbohydrates.

Regional variants

The method of preparation varies from place to place. There are many varieties of Obbattu including peanut, sugar, coconut, sesame and groundnut flavours. Sometimes grated coconut is added in Konkan, Maharashtra. Coconut palm jaggery may be used. Similarly, a mix of sugar and jaggery can be used as a sweetening agent. Normally nutmeg is used as a flavouring along the coast which is replaced by cardamom or sometimes both elsewhere. Methods of rolling the stuffed dough also differ. It can be rolled using rice flour which makes the rolling very convenient. In some recipes flour is not used at all; oil or ghee is used to roll it into a flatbread instead. The rolled bread can be roasted with or without any ghee or oil, which sometimes is smeared after its completely cooked. In some places, all-purpose flour dough is used after adding a pinch of turmeric which gives it a traditional yellow color. The dish is produced using a sweet filling inside flour dough. This is then rolled out and cooked on a hot griddle, usually with ghee.

The size and thickness of puran puri also vary greatly. In Gujarat where the stuffing used is toor dal, it is smaller in size and thicker, whereas in holige with coconut stuffing it is larger in size and thinner.

Andhra Pradesh 
It is popularly called bobbattu and served on major festive and other occasions. It is one of the sweets of Coastal Andhra. The stuff used inside the bobbattu varies according the region. It is served hot and eaten by applying a layer of ghee to it. Rava bobbattu is another variant of bobbattu. It is called as poli in Rayalaseema region of Andhra Pradesh and obbattu in northeast Andhra Pradesh.

Karnataka 
It is a special dish served in the state of Karnataka on all occasions, especially during Yugadi/Ugadi. Different varieties of holige are served in various parts of Karnataka and the most common is the one prepared with yellow gram and sugar or jaggery and obbattu is also prepared using coconut and sugar as the ingredients.

Maharashtra
It is also the special dish of Maharashtra which is prepared on every occasion at every house especially during festivals such as Ganesh Chaturthi and Holi. It is eaten with Basundi, Aamras, Kadhi, Amti, etc. In Pune,  Puran Poli is eaten with a variant of Amti (flavored sour curry) known as Katachi Amti is prepared with the remaining water of Chana Dal used to make Puran. In the Vidarbha region of Maharashtra, jaggery is used in puran poli for sweetness, it is eaten with Wada - a pakora made of all lentils.

Tamil Nadu and Kerala
Opputtu in Tamil Nadu and payasaboli in Kerala is a golden yellow sweet pancake from Tamil Nadu and Kerala. It is eaten during a traditional Sadhya along with Payasam. Opputtu is especially popular in the southernmost districts of Tamil Nadu and Kerala, India.

Opputtu is eaten mostly after lunch or as an evening snack. It looks like a flattened chapati, is golden yellow, and is popularly sold in trains by hawkers. "Kadambur opputtu" is available in coconut and brown sugar flavours.
"Trivandrum Boli" is also a variety from Kerala.
Varieties of opputtu are available throughout the Deccan states.

See also 
 List of Indian breads

References

Maharashtrian cuisine
Tamil cuisine
Indian breads
Indian desserts
Gujarati cuisine
Flatbreads
Sweet breads
Roti
Andhra cuisine
Rayalaseema